Coadout is a commune in the Côtes-d'Armor department of Brittany in northwestern France.

Toponymy
This village was known as "Coatnoüet ( = Coatvoüet), 1160-1167; Coetuout, 1382; Quoetvout, 1427; Coitbout, 1434; Coetbout, 1477; Coatout, 1481; Coetdout, 1535; Coadoult, 1581.

The name Coadout is typically Breton, "koad" meaning "wood" and possibly the Old French word "nouë" via the Gaulish word "nauda" meaning "marsh" or from the Old Breton "but", "bot" and "bod" meaning "residence". Another interpretation gives the radical -out the etymology of Illtud.

Population

Inhabitants of Coadout are called Coadoutais in French.

See also
Communes of the Côtes-d'Armor department

References

External links

Communes of Côtes-d'Armor